Image for a Dead Man is a 1980 synthetic polymer paint, collage on canvas painting by Irish-Australian artist Ray Beattie. The work is one of a series of three paintings by Beattie collectively titled Sentimentality kills.

The photorealistic still life painting depicts a military jacket, slouch hat and identity discs hung over a wooden chair. An Australian flag (the Red Ensign variant) is sitting folded on the chair. The jacket has an Infantry Combat Badge and Vietnam War campaign medals pinned to it. An unplugged telephone socket and cable lie on the floor.

Beattie served with the 2nd Battalion, Royal Australian Regiment in Vietnam between May 1970 and July 1971. The jacket, hat and discs all belong to the artist rather than a dead soldier, however Beattie stated that "whenever he heard of another soldier's death he felt a part of himself also died".

The work was somewhat controversial at the time with the depiction seen as derogatory towards those Australians who fought in Vietnam. After its acquisition by the Australian War Memorial, a member of the public wrote in protest stating "artistic licence and abstract interpretation are completely out of place in a Memorial where the established forte is stark realism and accuracy of presentation." Scott Bevan, author of a book on Australian war art, responded stating."It was Ray's comment on war, not on those sent out to fight, those who do the sending".

The work is part of the collection of the Australian War Memorial in Canberra.

References

Australian paintings
1980 paintings
War paintings
Still life paintings
Vietnam War in popular culture
Military history of Australia during the Vietnam War
Collections of the Australian War Memorial